The BMW M2 is a high-performance version of the BMW 2 Series automobile developed by BMW's motorsport division, BMW M GmbH.

As the 2 Series replaced the 1 Series coupé and convertible models, the first generation M2 was marketed as the most basic M Car in the range. The M2 used the F8x chassis from the M3/M4, code name F87 and featured a more powerful and responsive, turbocharged and slightly modified BMW N55 series engine, while its successors, the M2 Competition and M2 CS, featured a high performance twin-turbocharged engine developed by BMW M GmbH (S55 engine); improved handling, suspension, and braking systems; aerodynamic body enhancements; interior/exterior accents with the tri-colour "M" (Motorsport) badging and increased weight. The M2 is unofficially considered as an indirect successor to the BMW 1 Series M Coupé.



First generation (F87; 2015–2021) 

The M2 was unveiled in Need for Speed in November 2015, before later premiering at the North American International Auto Show in January 2016. Production commenced in October 2015, first delivered early 2016 and the M2 was only available as a rear-wheel drive coupé. The M2 features reinforced pistons, and has lighter aluminium front and rear suspension components resulting in a  weight reduction. The M2 is available with a 6-speed manual or with a 7-speed dual-clutch transmission. 0–100 km/h acceleration times are 4.5 seconds manual transmission models and 4.3 seconds for models equipped with the 7-speed dual clutch transmission. The M2 was used as a safety car in the 2016 MotoGP season.

BMW M2 Performance Edition 
150 examples produced for the US market. The car is finished in Alpine White over black Dakota leather, and power is provided by a turbocharged 3.0-liter inline-six paired with a seven-speed M double-clutch transmission or manual 6 speed transmission.  Performance Edition equipment includes an M Performance coilover suspension and exhaust system with titanium tips, along with black trim, manually-adjustable front sport seats, an M Performance sport and track key.

All 150 Performance Editions were finished in Alpine White with Shadowline trim.  Additional equipment includes xenon headlights, LED door projectors, a rear spoiler lip, and black-finished kidney grilles, side gills, and mirror caps.

Factory 19″ Style 437M wheels wear staggered-width Michelin Pilot Super Sport tires. The Performance Edition equipment includes adjustable M Performance coilovers, and braking is handled by blue-finished calipers and cross-drilled rotors that are shared with the M4 F82.

The interior features seats trimmed in black Dakota leather with contrasting blue stitching, while carbon-fiber trim accents the dashboard, center console, and door panels. Manually-adjustable front sport seats are equipped as part of weight savings, along with single-zone automatic climate control, and removal of the smoker's package and Comfort Access proximity key.  Factory output was rated at 370 horsepower and 343 lb-ft of torque, and the top speed was increased from 155 mph to 168 mph for the Performance Edition.

A coilover adjustment wrench and rebound adjustment knob were included, along with an M Performance key that activates sport and track mode.

BMW M2 Competition

The BMW M2 Competition was introduced at the 2018 Beijing Auto Show and succeeded the standard M2 Coupé as a more powerful variant. Production began first in July 2018, delivered early 2019.

The M2 Competition uses the BMW M GmbH S55 engine, a high performance variant of the N55 engine, that has been detuned from its application in the F80 M3 and F82 M4. The decision to use the S55 engine was a result of Europe adopting the Worldwide Harmonised Light Vehicles Test Procedure as the official procedure to measure vehicle pollutants, which meant that the standard M2's N55 engine was no longer conformed to European emission standards. 
Differences from the N55 engine found in the standard M2, the S55 includes a closed-deck engine block, lightweight crankshaft, different crankshaft bearings, strengthened pistons/rods, different springs/valve material, twin turbos, twin fuel pumps, active exhaust, revised cooling system and intercoolers.
The engine also features a redesigned oil supply system, modified cooling system, and electronic locking differential parts that are adapted from the BMW M4 Competition Package. It also features a gasoline particulate filter in certain European Union countries to reduce emissions. The 0–100 km/h acceleration time is 4.4 seconds for six-speed manual transmission models, and 4.2 seconds for models with the 7-speed dual clutch transmission.

M Performance Parts 
The BMW M2 can be fitted with M Performance Parts. This includes a splitter, side skirts, fenders, bonnet, boot and a spoiler.

BMW M2 CS

The BMW M2 CS, a more track focused version of the BMW M2 Competition, and was unveiled online in November 2019 prior to its introduction at the LA Auto Show. Production began in March 2020, with 2,200 units planned for North America, Europe, Asia and Mexico.

The 0–100 km/h (62 mph) acceleration time is 4.2 seconds for six-speed manual transmission models, and 4.0 seconds for models with the 7-speed dual clutch transmission.

The M Performance Brakes option rotors and calipers from the M2 Competition are carried over as standard, but ceramic brakes are available as an option. An adaptive M suspension is standard along with an electronic locking differential. The wheel hubs and control arms are made from forged aluminium, with a carbon-fibre transmission tunnel as an additional weight-saving measure. The hood, roof and various aerodynamic parts are made of a carbon-fibre composite. The active exhaust system is new as well, and unique wheel designs in high-gloss Jet black or matte gold finishes differentiate it from other M2 models; Michelin Cup 2 tires are also available.

Inside, the centre console is also carbon-fibre, with Alcantara trim and an embroidered red "CS" badge; the seats are leather and Alcantara with red contrast stitching and are complemented by contrast-stitched Alcantara on the steering wheel. The central armrest and rear AC vents, which are standard on the M2 and M2 Competition, have been removed for some little weight reduction.

The M2 CS has been widely acclaimed in car reviews, winning the coveted Evo Car of the Year 2020 awards beating out several supercars from McLaren and Porsche.

Motor Trend's Jonny Lieberman called it the best BMW M car in 12 years.

Second generation (G87; 2023–present) 

The G87 M2 was shown to the public ahead of its debut at Motorclassica in Melbourne, Australia, in October 2022. It remains rear-wheel drive and will be available with a 6-speed manual or with an 8-speed automatic. 0–100 km/h acceleration times are 4.3 seconds for manual transmission models and 4.1 seconds for automatic transmission models.

Some markets will have an optional carbon package.  The package will include M carbon bucket seats that are both power operated and heated as well as a carbon roof and carbon fiber interior trim.  A power sunroof will be standard in the US but optional in Europe. Other options include a Shadowline package, a lighting package which offers full-LED adaptive headlights and automatic high beams and driver assistant packages.

The car is expected to launch in April 2023.

The M2 will be offered in five colors including Zandvoort Blue which is exclusive to the G87 M2.

Motorsport

BMW M235i Racing 

The M235i Racing is a track version of the 2 Series developed by the BMW Motorsport division and was produced from 2014 to 2018. It was aimed at amateur drivers due to its relatively lower price and addition of driver aids such as anti-lock brakes, traction control, and dynamic stability control. The M235i Racing also features a mechanical limited-slip differential and larger brakes and springs. The front and rear spoilers, diffuser, and wing mirrors are from the BMW M Performance Parts catalog. The car was used in the BMW M235i Racing Cup which was part of the VLN Endurance Championship at the Nürburgring. It was also sold to customer teams in other championships such as the 24H Series, Touring Car Endurance Series, and Pirelli World Challenge.

BMW M240i Racing 

The BMW M240i Racing is an updated version heavily revised by BMW M Motorsport from its predecessor, the BMW M235i Racing, used from the 2019 season and on of the BMW M240i Racing Cup, from the 2019 season and on. The BMW M240i Racing features revised spoiler end plates, updated engine software, and an optional newly designed driver's seat. As it is a racecar, it still has an FIA-approved full roll cage, certified by DMSB. Deliveries started in 2020.

BMW M2 CS Racing 
The BMW M2 CS Racing is a racing variant of the road-going M2 CS, developed by BMW M Motorsport, to get beginner drivers to be involved in motorsport. The racecar has many developments that have been inspired by and developed further from its predecessors, the BMW M235i Racing, and the BMW M240i Racing, along with its "bigger brother" racecar, the BMW M4 GT4. The racecar gets power from a race-prepped 3-liter twin-turbo inline-6 that can generate anywhere from 280 hp (205 kW) to 365 hp (268 kW) depending on the configuration of the power stick, which is in turn controlled by the need to have a balance of performance or from regulations of a Permit B classification. The BMW M2 CS Racing also features a full FIA-approved roll cage, along with many motorsport-specific components, such as the rear wing, including ABS systems specifically tailored to the car by BMW M Motorsport. A stronger performance package is being made right now to allow the racecar to have up to 450 hp, just 6 hp more than the current street-legal version. Deliveries of the BMW M2 CS Racing are expected to start in mid-2020.

Concept cars

2002 Hommage Concept 
The BMW 2002 Hommage Concept was introduced in May 2016 at the Concorso d'Eleganza Villa d'Este and pays tribute to the BMW 2002 turbo. The car's underpinnings are based on a BMW M2.

2002 Hommage Turbomeister Concept 
The BMW 2002 Hommage Turbomeister Concept was introduced in August 2016 at Pebble Beach Concours d'Elegance.

References

Coupés
Rear-wheel-drive vehicles
Cars introduced in 2016
Sports cars
M2